Wajahat Masood is a Pakistani journalist, columnist and political analyst. He is widely considered to be a liberal, and a human rights activist. He is currently working with the Urdu-language newspaper Daily Jang. He has earlier worked with BBC and other organisations. He is currently the chief editor of humsub Urdu & humsub English

Early life and career
Wajahat Masood was born on 3 August 1966. He did his graduation from Government College University, Lahore and M.A. English from University of the Punjab, Lahore, Pakistan. Then he went on to earn an LLM degree in International Human Rights Law from the University of Leeds, UK.

He has been active in three fields: education, human rights and journalism. In 1994, he founded and then worked as a director for the Democratic Commission for Human Development for 11 years besides acting as a consultant for different international development agencies. Wajahat Masood trained thousands of young activists in the villages of Pakistan in human rights and human development. Wajahat Masood has been acting as chairperson, Center for Social Justice since 2014.

He was associated with national dailies such as The News International, The Post (Pakistani newspaper) and Daily Aaj Kal. He also worked as the editor of monthly magazine Nawa-i-Insaan, Daily Mashriq and weekly Hum Shehri. He was a columnist for BBC Urdu service during 2005–08.

He has been a political analyst for Pakistani television (PTV), Samaa TV, AAP News and Radio Pakistan. In addition, he appears as a  TV commentator for PNN four evenings a week apart from different private television channels in Pakistan and abroad.

He was teaching at Beaconhouse National University until July 2015, when he resigned from that position. He has taught at University of the Punjab, Government College University, Lahore, National College of Arts (Lahore) and Lahore School of Law. He is currently the Chief Editor of e-paper Humsub. He was the founding editor of Dunyapakistan.com. He is a highly acclaimed Urdu language columnist. He writes three columns a week for the most widely circulated Urdu language newspaper in the country, Daily Jang besides a weekly column for Deutsche Welle.

Pakistan's veteran journalist and columnist I.A. Rehman has talked highly of Wajahat Masood's journalistic abilities in his recently published book. I.A. Rehman says that Wajahat Masood not only informs his readers but also helps them understand the larger picture in terms of the political situation in Pakistan.

Publications 
Wajahat Masood has authored several booklets and books on politics, history, culture and literature.

 Mahaasray Ka Roznaamcha
 Aman Mumkin Hai
 Jamhooriat ke 100 Baras
 Nisab-e-Gul
 What is Democracy
 What is Critical Thinking
 What is Secularism
 What is Fundamentalism

Articles

 The dynamics of Khan's victory
 Icon of democracy
 The people's party
 Certainly no time to die
 Soft-crust religious extremism
 A captive freedom

Awards and recognition
Pride of Performance Award for journalism by the President of Pakistan in 2016
National Bibliophile Award in 2013

References

1966 births
Gujranwala
Living people
Pakistani columnists
Recipients of the Pride of Performance